Shamrock is an unincorporated community located in the town of Manchester, Jackson County, Wisconsin, United States.

Images

References

Unincorporated communities in Jackson County, Wisconsin
Unincorporated communities in Wisconsin